Magnar Åm (born 9 April 1952) is a Norwegian composer.

Selected works
Concerto for Accordion "Tropic of Cancer" (available for listening from here)

References

External links 
Composer's Webpage 

1952 births
Norwegian composers
Norwegian male composers
Living people
Place of birth missing (living people)